Yuquan District (Mongolian:    Юйчюань тойрог Iui čiuvan toɣoriɣ) is one of four districts of the prefecture-level city of Hohhot, the capital of Inner Mongolia Autonomous Region, North China.

Yuquan means “The spring as beautiful as jade” in Chinese, it was named after a spring nearby Dazhao Temple. The north side of Yuquan District is the old town of Guihua, the middle area was built in 1950-1980s, the south side was built after 1990s. The new campus of the University of Inner Mongolia is in the south side.

References

www.xzqh.org 

County-level divisions of Inner Mongolia
Hohhot